Hipólito "Poli" Rincón Povedano (born 28 April 1957) is a Spanish former footballer who played as a striker.

He played mainly for Real Madrid and Real Betis in a 13-year career, amassing La Liga totals of 239 games and 81 goals.

Having won 22 caps for Spain, Rincón appeared with the national team at the 1986 World Cup.

Club career
Rincón was born in Lavapiés, Madrid. A Real Madrid youth graduate, he served three loan stints during his tenure, one in the lower leagues with CD Díter Zafra, eventually making his debut for the former's first team on 14 October 1979 in a 3–2 home win against Real Zaragoza and scoring twice as a second-half substitute; he could never impose himself in the capital side's main squad, however, totalling only 16 La Liga games from 1979 to 1981.

Rincón joined Andalusia's Real Betis for the 1981–82 season, netting 20 league goals in his second year which earned him the Pichichi Trophy, even though his team could only rank 11th. He went on to score 93 times in all competitions for the club, and retired at the end of the 1988–89 campaign aged 32 after suffering top-flight relegation.

In 2004, Rincón served briefly as Betis neighbours Xerez CD's director of football. He also worked as sports commentator for Cadena SER and Cadena COPE.

International career
Rincón played 22 times and scored ten goals for the Spain national team over three years. His debut came on 27 April 1983 in a UEFA Euro 1984 qualifier against the Republic of Ireland, in Zaragoza; in only 15 minutes of play, after replacing FC Barcelona's Francisco Carrasco, he scored the final 2–0.

On 21 December 1983, in his sixth international, Rincón netted four times in Spain's historic 12–1 victory over Malta, in a Euro 1984 qualifying match played in Seville. He would not be however picked for the finals in France, being selected two years later for the 1986 FIFA World Cup squad but making no appearances in Mexico.

Career statistics

International
International goals scored by Hipólito Rincón

Honours
Real Madrid
La Liga: 1979–80
Copa del Rey: 1979–80

Individual
Pichichi Trophy: 1982–83

References

External links

1957 births
Living people
Spanish footballers
Footballers from Madrid
Association football forwards
La Liga players
Segunda División players
Tercera División players
Real Madrid CF players
Recreativo de Huelva players
Real Valladolid players
Real Betis players
Spain under-23 international footballers
Spain amateur international footballers
Spain international footballers
1986 FIFA World Cup players
Olympic footballers of Spain
Footballers at the 1980 Summer Olympics
Pichichi Trophy winners